The 1954–55 Quaid-e-Azam Trophy was a first-class cricket competition that was held in Pakistan from 29 October 1954 to 24 April 1955. It was the second edition of the Quaid-e-Azam Trophy.

The competition was contested as a knockout tournament by nine teams, an increase of two from the first season, representing both regions and government departments; East Pakistan cricket team and Baluchistan made their first appearances in the Quaid-e-Azam Trophy. 1953–54 winner Bahawalpur received a bye through to the semi-finals.

The final, played in Karachi, was contested between Karachi and Combined Services. Karachi won by nine wickets, easily scoring the 33 runs they needed for victory after forcing Combined Services to follow-on in their second innings.

Teams

Results

Source:

Final

References

Domestic cricket competitions in 1954–55
1954 in Pakistani cricket
1955 in Pakistani cricket
1954-55 Quaid-e-Azam Trophy